Wachsenburggemeinde is a former municipality in the district Ilm-Kreis, in Thuringia, Germany. The municipality was named after the Wachsenburg Castle which is located in its center. It consisted of the five villages named Bittstädt, Haarhausen, Holzhausen, Röhrensee, and Sülzenbrücken. Since 31 December 2012, it is part of the municipality Amt Wachsenburg.

References

Former municipalities in Thuringia